Ramakrishna Mission (RKM) is a Hindu religious and spiritual organisation which forms the core of a worldwide spiritual movement known as the Ramakrishna Movement or the Vedanta Movement. The mission is named after an  Indian spiritual Guru Ramakrishna Paramahamsa and founded by Ramakrishna's chief disciple Swami Vivekananda on 1 May 1897. The organisation mainly propagates the Hindu philosophy of Vedanta–Advaita Vedanta and four yogic ideals – Jnana, Bhakti, Karma, and Raja yoga.

Apart from religious and spiritual teaching, the organisation carries out extensive educational and philanthropic work in India and abroad. This aspect came to be a feature of many other Hindu movements. The mission bases its work on the principles of Karma yoga, the principle of selfless work done with a dedication to God. The Ramakrishna Mission has centres around the world and publishes many important Hindu texts. It is affiliated with the monastic organization. Vivekananda was greatly influenced by his guru (teacher) Ramakrishna, who also believed in Universalism.

Overview 

The Math and the Mission are the two key organisations that direct the work of the socio-spiritual-religious Ramakrishna movement, influenced by 19th-century saint Ramakrishna Paramahamsa and founded by his chief disciple Vivekananda.
Also referred to as the Ramakrishna Order, the Math is the movement's monastic organisation. Founded by Vivekananda in 1897, the Math primarily focuses on spiritual training and the propagation of the movement's teachings.

The Mission, founded by Vivekananda in 1897, is a humanitarian and spiritual organisation which carries out medical, relief and educational programs. Both the organisations have headquarters at the Belur Math. The Mission acquired a legal status when it was registered in 1909 under Act XXI of 1860. Its management is vested in a Governing Body. Though the Mission with its branches is a distinct legal entity, it is closely related to the Math. The elected trustees of the Math also serve as Mission's Governing Body. Vedanta Societies comprise the American arm of the Movement and work more in purely spiritual field rather than social welfare.

History 

Ramakrishna Paramahamsa (1836–1886), regarded as a 19th-century mystic, was the inspirator of the Ramakrishna Order of monks and is regarded as the spiritual founder of the Ramakrishna Movement. Ramakrishna was a priest in the Dakshineswar Kali Temple and attracted several monastic and householder disciples. Narendranath Dutta, who later became Vivekananda, was one of the chief monastic disciples. According to Vrajaprana, shortly before his death in 1886 Ramakrishna gave the ochre cloths to his young disciples, who were planning to become renunciates. Ramakrishna entrusted the care of these young boys to Vivekananda. After Ramakrishna's death, the young disciples of Ramakrishna gathered and practised spiritual disciplines. They took informal monastic vows on a night of 24 December 1886.

After the death of Ramakrishna in 1886, the monastic disciples formed the first Math (monastery) at Baranagore. Later Vivekananda became a wandering monk and in 1893 he was a delegate at the 1893 Parliament of the World's Religions. His speech there, beginning with "Sisters and brothers of America" became famous and brought him widespread recognition. Vivekananda went on lecture tours and held private discourses on Hinduism and spirituality. He also founded the first Vedanta Society in the United States at New York. He returned to India in 1897 and founded the Ramakrishna Mission on 1 May 1897. Though he was a Hindu sadhu and was hailed as the first Hindu missionary in modern times, he exhorted his followers to be true to their faith but respect all religions of the world as his guru Ramakrishna had taught that all religions are pathways to God. One such example is his exhortion that one can be born in a church but he or she should not die in a church meaning that one should realise the spiritual truths for themselves and not stop at blindly believing in doctrines taught to them. The same year, famine relief was started at Sargachi by Swami Akhandananda, a direct disciple of Ramakrishna. Swami Brahmananda, a direct disciple of Ramakrishna, was appointed as the first president of the Order. After the death of Vivekananda in 1902, Sarada Devi, the spiritual counterpart of Ramakrishna, played an important role as the advisory head of a nascent monastic organisation. Gayatri Spivak writes that Sarada Devi "performed her role with tact and wisdom, always remaining in the background."

Administration 

The Ramakrishna Math is administered by a democratically elected board of trustees. From amongst themselves, the trustees elect president, vice-presidents, general secretary, assistant secretaries and treasurer. For the confirmation of the election of the president, vice-presidents and the general secretary, the opinion of monks of twenty years standing is sought and taken.

The Ramakrishna Mission is administered by a Governing Body, which is composed of the democratically elected Trustees of Ramakrishna Math. The headquarters of Ramakrishna Math at Belur (popularly known as Belur Math) serves also as the headquarters of Ramakrishna Mission.
A branch centre of Ramakrishna Math is managed by a team of monks posted by the Trustees, led by a head monk with the title Adhyaksha. A branch centre of Ramakrishna Mission is governed by a Managing Committee consisting of monks and laypersons appointed by the Governing Body of Ramakrishna Mission whose Secretary, almost always a monk, functions as the executive head.

All the monks of the Ramakrishna Order form the democratic base of the administration. They form the counterpart to the Organisation of what is Parliament to the Nation. A representative meeting of all monks is held every three years, at Belur Math, during October–November. This meeting has come to be known as 'Monks' Conference'. The Conference is for the duration of three days. A few months prior to the conference, all the monks are notified about the dates and are asked to suggest subjects for discussion and to send Resolutions to be taken up for discussion. The Agenda is finalised based on the suggestions received. On the first day of the Conference, The general secretary, on behalf of all elected Trustees, places the report of all the activities that had taken place in the Organisation, during the years that had gone by since they met last. The accounts are then placed before the Conference by the monk in-charge of accounts. The Conference passes the accounts and discusses the Report of activities. The Minutes of the earlier Conference too is passed. The monks also condole the deaths that had occurred in their ranks in the years between successive Conferences. The proposals of monks are voted upon if necessary.

Thus, The Monks' Conference plays a very important Constitutional role of placing its seal of approval on the decisions taken by the Trustees elected by them and giving policy guidance for further works of the Organisation.

The first such formal Conference was held in 1935. The latest and the 25th such Conference was held on 1, 2 and 3 November 2018.

The scope of the Administration follows the detailed rules made by Swami Vivekananda when he was the General President of Ramakrishna Mission. These rules were formed when the monastic brothers in 1898 wished that there should be specific rules for the work of the Ramakrishna Mission (as the Ramakrishna Movement is commonly known). They were dictated by Swami Vivekananda to Swami Suddhananda, between 1898 and 1899, and has been accepted as the consensus of the opinion of all the monks of the Ramakrishna Mission then, consisting of all the disciples of Sri Ramakrishna and their disciples. Later for clear and formal legal confirmation of these rules, a Trust Deed was registered by Swami Vivekananda and many of the other disciples of Sri Ramakrishna, during 1899 – 1901.

Motto and principles 
The aims and ideals of the Mission are purely spiritual and humanitarian and has no connection with politics. Vivekananda proclaimed "Renunciation and service" as the twofold national ideals of modern India. The mission strives to practice and preach these. The service activities are based on the message of "Jiva is Shiva" from Ramakrishna and Vivekananda's message of "Daridra Narayana" to indicate that service to poor is service to God. The Principles of Upanishads and Yoga in Bhagavad Gita reinterpreted in the light of Ramakrishna's Life and Teachings is the main source of inspiration for the Mission. The service activities are rendered, looking upon all as veritable manifestation of the Divine. The Motto of the organisation is Atmano Mokshartham Jagad-hitaya Chah. Translated from Sanskrit आत्मनॊ मोक्षार्थम् जगद्धिताय च: it means For one's own salvation, and for the good of the world. The ideology of Ramakrishna Math and mission is that universe arises and sustains in infinite pure consciousness or Brahman. Personification of Brahman, we get Ishvara or God of Religion (Like Vishnu, Shiva, Shakti, Allah, Jesus/Yahweh/Jehovah, Waheguru, etc.). Ramakrishna Mission teaches that God-Realization is the ultimate goal of life. Brahman is immanent in all beings as the Atman which is man's true self and source of all happiness. But owing to ignorance, he identifies himself with his body and mind and runs after sense pleasures. This is the cause of all evil and suffering. As ignorance is removed, the Atman manifests itself more and more. This manifestation of potential divinity is the essence of true religion. This can be realized by one of the 4 yogas or by all of them. Ramakrishna Mission also believes in Harmony of religions, means all religions lead to the same goal if followed properly.

Monastic Order 
After the death of Ramakrishna in 1886, his young disciples organised themselves into a new monastic order. The original monastery at Baranagar, known as Baranagar Math, was subsequently moved to the nearby Alambazar area in 1892, then to Nilambar Mukherjee's Garden House, south of the present Belur Math in 1898 before finally being shifted in January 1899 to a newly acquired plot of land at Belur in Howrah district by Vivekananda. This monastery, known as the Belur Math, serves as the Mother House for all the monks of the Order who live in the various branch centres of the Math and/or the Mission in different parts of India and the world.

All members of the Order undergo training and ordination (Sannyasa) at Belur Math. A candidate for monastic life is treated as a pre-probationer during the first year of his stay at any centre, and as a probationer during the next four years. At the end of this period he is ordained into celibacy (Brahmacharya) and is given certain vows (Pratijna), the most important of which are celibacy, renunciation and service. After a further period of four years, if found fit, he is ordained into (Sannyasa) and given the ochre (gerua) clothes to wear.

Attitude towards politics 
Swami Vivekananda forbade his organisation from taking part in any political movement or activity, on the basis of the idea that holy men are apolitical.

Almost 95% of the monks possess voter ID cards for the sake of identification and particularly for travelling, as they are forced by governmental authorities to seek a voter ID card. But they generally use it only for identification purpose and not for voting though they are not forbidden to vote. As individuals, the monks may have political opinions, but these are not meant to be discussed in public.

The Mission, had, however, supported the movement of Indian independence, with a section of the monks keeping close apolitical relations with freedom fighters of various camps. A number of political revolutionaries later joined the Ramakrishna Order.

Emblem 
Designed and explained by Swami Vivekananda in his own words:
The wavy waters in the picture are symbolic of Karma; the lotus, of Bhakti; and the rising-sun, of Jnana. The encircling serpent is indicative of [Raja] Yoga and the awakened Kundalini Shakti, while the swan in the picture stands for Paramatman (Supreme Self). Therefore, the idea of the picture is that by the union of Karma, Jnana, Bhakti and Yoga, the vision of Paramatman is obtained.

Activities 

The principal workers of the mission are the monks. The mission's activities cover the following areas,
 Education
 Healthcare
 Cultural activities
 Rural upliftment
 Tribal welfare
 Youth movement, spiritual teachings
The mission has its own hospitals, charitable dispensaries, maternity clinics, tuberculosis clinics, and mobile dispensaries. It also maintains training centres for nurses. Orphanages and homes for the elderly are included in the mission's field of activities, along with rural and tribal welfare work.

The mission has established many renowned educational institutions in India, having its own university, colleges, vocational training centres, high schools and primary schools, teacher-training institutes, as well as schools for the visually handicapped. It has also been involved in disaster relief operations during famine, epidemic, fire, flood, earthquake, cyclone and communal disturbances.

The mission played an important role in the installation of photovoltaic (PV) lighting systems in the Sundarbans region of West Bengal. Due to the geographical features of the Sunderbans, it is very difficult to extend the grid network to supply power to its population. The PV lighting was used to provide electricity to the people who were traditionally depending on kerosene and diesel.

Religious activities 
The mission is a non-sectarian organisation and ignores caste distinctions.

Ramakrishna ashrama's religious activities include satsang and arati. Satsang includes communal prayers, songs, rituals, discourses, reading and meditation. Arati involves the ceremonial waving of lights before the images of a deity of holy person and is performed twice in a day.
Ramakrishna ashramas observes major Hindu festivals, including Maha Shivarathri, Rama Navami, Krishna Ashtami and Durga Puja. They also give special place to the birthdays of Ramakrishna, Sarada Devi, Swami Vivekananda and his other monastic disciples. 1 January is celebrated as Kalpataru Day.

The math and the mission are known for their religious tolerance and respect for other religions. Among the earliest rules laid down by Swami Vivekananda for them was, "Due respect and reverence should be paid to all religions, all preachers, and to the deities worshiped in all religions." Acceptance and toleration of all religions is the one of ideals of Ramakrishna Math and Mission. Along with the major Hindu festivals, Christmas Eve and Buddha's birthday are also devoutly observed.
Cyril Veliath of Sophia University writes that the Ramakrishna Mission monks are a relatively orthodox set of monks who are "extremely well respected both in India and abroad", and that they "cannot be classified as just another sect or cult, such as the groups led by the gurus". Veliath writes that "of the Hindu groups I have worked with I have found the Ramakrishna Mission to be the most tolerant and amenable to dialogue, and I believe that we Christians couldn't do better, than to cooperate wholeheartedly in their efforts towards inter-religious harmony.

Awards and honourable mentions 
The Ramakrishna Mission has received numerous accolades throughout its lifetime:
 Bhagwan Mahavir Foundation Award (1996).
 Dr. Ambedkar National Award (1996).
 Dr. Bhawar Singh Porte Tribal Service Award (1997–98).
 In 1998 the Mission was awarded the Indian government's prestigious Gandhi Peace Prize.
 Shahid Vir Narayan Singh Award (2001).
 Pt. Ravishankar Shukla Award (2002).
 National Communal Harmony Award (2005).
 The Ramakrishna Mission was selected for an honorary mention of the UNESCO Madanjeet Singh Prize for Promotion of Tolerance and Non violence 2002.
 The Ramakrishna Mission Ashrama Narainpur, Chhattisgarh was jointly selected for the 25th Indira Gandhi Award for National Integration for the year 2009 with musician A.R.Rehman for their services in promoting and preserving national integration.
In a speech made in 1993, Federico Mayor, Director-General of UNESCO, stated:

Branch centres

As of seventh March 2022, the Math and Mission have 265 centres all over the world: 198 in India, 26 in Bangladesh, 14 in the United States, two each in Canada, Russia, and South Africa and one each in Argentina, Australia, Brazil, Fiji, France, Germany, Ireland, Japan, Malaysia, Mauritius, Nepal, Netherlands, Singapore, Sri Lanka, Switzerland, UK, and Zambia. Besides, there are 44 sub-centres (14 within India, 30 outside India) under different centres.
The Math and Mission run 748 educational institutions (including 12 colleges, 22 higher secondary schools, 41 secondary schools, 135 schools of other grades, 4 polytechnics, 48 vocational training centres, 118 hostels, 7 orphanages, etc.) with a total student population of more than 2,00,000.
Besides these branch centres, there are about one thousand unaffiliated centres (popularly called 'private centres') all over the world started by the devotees and followers of Sri Ramakrishna and Swami Vivekananda.

The centres of the Ramakrishna Order outside India fall into two broad categories. In countries such as Bangladesh, Nepal, Sri Lanka, Fiji and Mauritius, the nature of service activities is very much similar to India. In other parts of the world, especially in Europe, Canada, United States, Japan, and Australia, the work is mostly confined to the preaching of Vedanta, the publication of books and journals and personal guidance in spiritual matters. Many of the centres outside India are called as the 'Vedanta Society' or 'Vedanta Centre'.

Former presidents 

The following is the list of presidents (spiritual heads) of the Monastic Order:
 Swami Vivekananda (1897–1901) (Founder & General President)

From 1901 the term 'General President' was dropped and the term 'President' was added.

Swami Brahmananda (1901–1922)
Swami Shivananda (1922–1934)
Swami Akhandananda (1934–1937)
Swami Vijnanananda (1937–1938)
Swami Shuddhananda (1938–1938)
Swami Virajananda (1938–1951)
Swami Shankarananda (1951–1962)
Swami Vishuddhananda (1962–1962)
Swami Madhavananda (1962–1965)
Swami Vireshwarananda (1966–1985)
Swami Gambhirananda (1985–1988)
Swami Bhuteshananda (1989–1998)
Swami Ranganathananda (1998–2005)
Swami Gahanananda (2005–2007)
Swami Atmasthananda (2007–2017)
Swami Smaranananda (2017–present)

The Heritage

Litigation 
In 1980, in an act that caused "considerable debate" within the order, the mission petitioned the courts to have their organisation and movement declared a non-Hindu minority religion for the purpose of Article 30 of the Indian constitution.
Many generations of monks and others have been of the view that the religion propounded and practised by Ramakrishna and his disciples is very much different from that practised by Hindu masses then. They held that the Ramakrishna's "Neo-Vedanta" is a truer version of the ideals of Vedanta. So it was honestly felt that this makes the followers of Ramakrishna eligible for the legal status of "minority". It is possible that the immediate cause for the appeal for minority status was because there was a danger that the local Marxist government would take control of its educational institutions unless it could invoke the extra protection the Indian constitution accords to minority religions. 
They argued that the Ramakrishna's "Neo-Vedanta" is a truer version of the ideals of Vedanta, and that this makes the followers of Ramakrishna eligible for the legal status of "minority". While the Calcutta High Court accepted Ramakrishna Mission's pleas, the Supreme Court of India ruled against the Mission in 1995, citing evidence that it had all the characteristics of a Hindu organization. The Mission found it advisable to let the matter rest. The wisdom of the attempt by the Mission's leadership to characterize the Mission as non-Hindu was widely questioned within the membership of the organization itself, and the leadership today embraces the Mission's status as both a Hindu organization and as an organization that emphasizes the harmony of all faiths. Most members – and even monks – of the Ramakrishna Mission consider themselves Hindus, and the Mission's founding figures, such as Swami Vivekananda never disavowed Hinduism.

See also 
 List of publications by Ramakrishna Mission
 List of Ramakrishna Mission institutions

References

Further reading 
 Prabhananda, Swami. The Early History of the Ramakrishna Movement (2005) 
Elst, Koenraad. Who is a Hindu - Hindu Revivalist Views of Animism, Buddhism, Sikhism and Other Offshoots of Hinduism (2001) Online version of Chapter 6 
 Swarup, Ram: Ramakrishna Mission in Search of a New Identity. (1986) PDF in www.archive.org

External links 

 
  
 About Ramakrishna Math and Ramakrishna Mission

 

 
Ramakrishna
Hindu denominations
Recipients of the Gandhi Peace Prize
Founders of Indian schools and colleges
Hindu organisations based in India
Hindu new religious movements
Articles containing video clips
Religious organizations established in 1897
1897 establishments in India
Neo-Vedanta
Religious organisations based in India
Tourist attractions in Howrah
Charities based in India
Recipients of Pravasi Bharatiya Samman